Stephanie Gisel "Colo" Tregartten Fontes (born 13 October 1997) is a Uruguayan footballer who plays as a defender for Paysandú FC and the Uruguay women's national team.

International career
Tregartten represented Uruguay at the 2012 FIFA U-17 Women's World Cup. At senior level, she played the 2018 Copa América Femenina.

References 

1997 births
Living people
Footballers from Montevideo
Uruguayan women's footballers
Women's association football defenders
Sud América players
Paysandú F.C. players
Uruguay women's international footballers